Julissa D'Anne Gomez (November 4, 1972 – August 8, 1991) was an American gymnast whose rapid rise through the ranks of elite gymnastics in the mid-1980s was cut short by a vaulting accident in 1988 that left her a quadriplegic. She eventually died from her injury. She was being coached by Al Fong, and had previously been coached by Bela Karolyi.

Her injury sparked major changes to the vaulting discipline of women's gymnastics with the goal of preventing such serious injuries.

Career
Gomez was born in San Antonio, Texas, the older of two daughters born to a pair of former migrant farm workers from Laredo, Texas. Her parents, mother Otilia and father Ramiro, worked their way up from their farm working days to become a teacher and a welder, respectively, and struggled to keep their family together while giving 10-year-old budding gymnast Julissa a chance to train with renowned gymnastics coach Béla Károlyi in Houston. At the 1986 U.S. Championships, she placed fourth in the all-around in the junior division and won a place on the U.S. National Team. By 1987, she was representing the United States in international meets. Especially strong on the uneven bars and balance beam, Gomez was considered a legitimate contender for the 1988 U.S. Olympic team.

In mid-1987, Gomez, wanting to move further up the rankings and reportedly frustrated with Károlyi's sometimes abusive training methods, decided to leave the Károlyis. After briefly training at US Acrosports in Webster, Texas, Gomez's search for a new coach led her to select Al Fong, who was the trainer of another up-and-coming gymnast eager to make the 1988 Olympic team, Christy Henrich. Though her parents had vowed to keep the family together no matter where Julissa's career took her, they decided that Ramiro would move with Julissa to Blue Springs, Missouri, where Fong's gymnastics club, Great American Gymnastics Express (GAGE), was located while Otilia would remain behind until Julissa's younger sister Kristy finished school for the year.

Injury and death
In May 1988, several months before the Olympics, Gomez traveled with her coach to Tokyo, Japan, to compete in the World Sports Fair. During the all-around competition, Gomez qualified for the vault finals. However, observers had noticed her struggle with the apparatus over the months leading up to the competition, including her former coach Béla Károlyi, past and present teammates, and even her present coach Al Fong. Gomez' technique on the extremely difficult Yurchenko vault had been described as shaky at best, and Gomez was unable to perform the vault with any consistency during practices, sometimes missing her feet on the springboard. A teammate from Károlyi's, Chelle Stack, later stated, "You could tell it was not a safe vault for her to be doing. Someone along the way should have stopped her." However, Julissa's coaches insisted that she needed to continue training and competing the Yurchenko vault in order to achieve high scores.

During warmups for the final, held on May 5, 1988, Gomez continued to practice the Yurchenko. As she raced toward the vault on one of her practice runs, her foot slipped off the springboard and she slammed headfirst into the vaulting horse at high speed. The resulting impact instantly paralyzed her from the neck down. A subsequent accident at a Japanese hospital, in which she became disconnected from her ventilator, resulted in severe brain damage and left her in a coma. Gomez's family cared for her for three years before she succumbed to an infection and died in August 1991 in Houston.

Aftermath
Gomez's accident stands as one of the most serious to occur in artistic gymnastics, and helped prompt changes in the sport. In 1989, the International Gymnastics Federation decided to increase vaulting safety by allowing U-shaped springboard mats, traditionally utilized in practice to give all gymnasts a greater margin of error in preflight, to be used during competitions. The mat is now mandatory: the 2006 Code of Points specifies that performing a Yurchenko-style vault without the safety mat results in an automatic score of zero.

In 2001, the traditional horse was completely phased out and replaced by a larger, more stable vaulting table to provide gymnasts with additional safety.

See also
 Elena Mukhina, a Soviet gymnast paralyzed in a tumbling accident in 1980 while attempting the now-banned Thomas salto.
 Christy Henrich, an American gymnast who was told she was fat by an international gymnastics judge in 1989 and pushed by coaches to lose weight while continuing to train until constant dieting led to anorexia nervosa, which contributed to Henrich's death from multiple organ failure less than five years later.
 Little Girls in Pretty Boxes, book by Joan Ryan recalling Julissa Gomez's story, along with other gymnasts and figure skaters.

References

External links
Memorial at Gymnastic Greats

1972 births
1991 deaths
20th-century American women
20th-century American people
American female artistic gymnasts
People with tetraplegia
Sports deaths in Texas
Sportspeople from San Antonio
U.S. women's national team gymnasts